These are the Official Charts Company UK Official Indie Chart number one hits of 2003.

See also
2003 in music

References

2003 record charts
Indie 2003
2003 in British music